Jeremy Norman Henry (born 3 April 1974) is a former Irish and current Australian lawn and indoor bowler born in Northern Ireland.

Bowls career

Outdoor Bowls
Henry has achieved major success in the sport winning two gold medals in the World Outdoor Bowls Championship and three Commonwealth Games medals.

In 1996 he won the gold in the pairs with Sammy Allen at the 1996 World Outdoor Bowls Championship in Adelaide, Australia. Four years later he won a second gold at the 2000 World Outdoor Bowls Championship in the singles in Johannesburg, South Africa.

In the Commonwealth Games he won the bronze medal at the 1998 Commonwealth Games in the singles at Bukit Kiara, Kuala Lumpur in Malaysia and four years later won silver at the 2002 Commonwealth Games in Heaton Park, Manchester. Another silver medal in 2006 came in the triples event.

All of the medals were won representing a combined Ireland team or Northern Ireland (Commonwealth Games) before Henry emigrated to Australia where he resides and plays for Warilla and has been capped by Australia.

He has also won six outdoor Irish National Bowls Championships; the 1996 and 2001 singles, the 1990, 1994 and 2003 pairs titles and the 1993 triples title. He has also won the singles at the British Isles Bowls Championships in 1997. In 2006, he won the Hong Kong International Bowls Classic singles title.

Indoor bowls
He won a 2004 World Indoor Bowls Championship pairs title with Ian McClure and after emigrating most of his career has been revolved around indoor bowls. He has taken advantage of the fact that the World Cup Singles are held at his home club which had contributed in a record six title wins in 2012, 2013, 2014, 2016, 2017 and 2018.

References

External links
 
 

1974 births
Living people
Male lawn bowls players from Northern Ireland
Australian male bowls players
Bowls World Champions
Indoor Bowls World Champions
Commonwealth Games medallists in lawn bowls
Commonwealth Games silver medallists for Northern Ireland
Commonwealth Games bronze medallists for Northern Ireland
Bowls players at the 1998 Commonwealth Games
Bowls players at the 2002 Commonwealth Games
Bowls players at the 2006 Commonwealth Games
Medallists at the 1998 Commonwealth Games
Medallists at the 2002 Commonwealth Games
Medallists at the 2006 Commonwealth Games